Jelena Gavrilović (Serbian Cyrillic: Јелена Гавриловић; born 18 January 1983) is a Serbian actress and singer. She started acting in theatre during primary and high school in Lazarevac, her home town. She graduated from the Art Academy in Acting at the University of Novi Sad.

Gavrilović performed the title roles for musicals Hair at Atelje 212, and Grease at Terazije Theatre, both in Belgrade. She played Marija, one of the main characters, in A Serbian Film. She was also a contestant on the show Tvoje lice zvuči poznato. She ranked 4th in the finals as Branislav Mojićević, but was a public favourite with many favoured imitations fulfilled, such as Jelena Rozga, Pink, Vesna Zmijanac, Predrag Živković Tozovac and many others.

Selected filmography

Film

Television

References

External links

Interview (Hello! Magazine, in Bosnian)

1983 births
Living people
Actresses from Belgrade
21st-century Serbian actresses
Serbian stage actresses
Serbian film actresses
Serbian voice actresses
Musical theatre actresses